The Port of Rizhao is a natural deep-water seaport on the coast of the city of Rizhao, Shandong Province, People's Republic of China, located on the southern shore of Shandong Peninsula, opening to the Yellow Sea. It has 46 deep-water berths in two main port areas (Lanzhao Port Area and Shijiu Port Area). In 2012 it reached a throughput of 284 million metric tons, making it the tenth-busiest port in China.

References

Ports and harbours of China